Pen Panha  (born 21 October 1941) is a Cambodian politician. He belongs to the Cambodian People's Party and was elected to represent Prey Veng Province in the National Assembly of Cambodia in 2003.

References

1941 births 
Cambodian People's Party politicians
Members of the National Assembly (Cambodia)
Living people